Danny Sanders (born May 14, 1955) is a former American football quarterback who played two seasons in the Canadian Football League (CFL) with the Hamilton Tiger-Cats and Saskatchewan Roughriders. He was drafted by the New York Jets in the eleventh round of the 1979 NFL Draft. He played college football at Carson–Newman University. Sanders was inducted into the South Atlantic Conference Hall of Fame in 2008 and the Carson-Newman Athletics Hall of Fame in 2010.

References

External links
Just Sports Stats

Living people
1955 births
Players of American football from Tennessee
American football quarterbacks
Canadian football quarterbacks
American players of Canadian football
Carson–Newman Eagles football players
Hamilton Tiger-Cats players
Saskatchewan Roughriders players
People from Oak Ridge, Tennessee